GoDai: Elemental Force is PlayStation 2 video game, released by The 3DO Company on January 21, 2002. Initially the game was scheduled to release in Fall 2001.

Gameplay
GoDai is a 3D action game with emphasis on melee combat. The game's environments are displayed through fixed camera angles.

The player controls a ninja named Hiro, who starts play unarmed but can collect a variety of Asian weapons throughout the game. These include blades such as swords and knives, spears and axes; all of which can be used to execute combo attacks. Larger weapons such as polearms have a longer reach, allowing Hiro to attack enemies without getting too close. Two weapons that the player has previously collected can be taken into each subsequent mission, more appear throughout the missions themselves, allowing Hiro to increase the amount of weapons he is carrying. Ranged weapons including shurikens and smoke bombs, and several types of ranged magical attacks like fireballs, can also be employed in tandem with close-quarters weapons.

Hiro possesses the ability to glide through the air by willpower alone, during which the player retains full control of Hiro's movement as he descends. The effect has been likened to wire-fu movies and takes the place of jumping in the game, allowing the player to bypass combat and traverse the game world. Some enemies are able to use this ability too, and will pursue Hiro through the air. Hiro also has the ability to roll, a dodging move, which is accompanied by a Max Payne-like bullet-time effect.

Reception

Reception to the game was "Generally unfavorable" according to review aggregator Metacritic, where it received 27% based on 10 reviews. Game Rankings gave a critical average of 32.69%.

IGN gave the game a score of 2.5/10, calling the story is "unappealing", the character design "awful", the animations "slow and choppy" and concluded that the "game just isn't fun". The only good thing they could say about it was the music, but added "too bad it's overshadowed by the bad voice acting." In his review for GameSpot, in which he gave the game a 3.3/10, Miguel Lopez criticised the fixed viewpoints saying  "more often than not GoDai simply feels like an over-the-shoulder game with a really bad camera" and said the slow-down felt like the Max Payne bullet-time "albeit much more poorly done." He concluded that there was "no remote reason why you'd want to subject yourself to GoDai."

References

External links

2002 video games
Action video games
Video games about ninja
PlayStation 2 games
PlayStation 2-only games
Video games developed in the United States
Video games scored by Ashif Hakik